The scrotal ligament is actually the remnant of gubernaculum in a fetus.  This ligament secures the testis to the most inferior portion of the scrotum, tethering it in place and limiting the degree to which the testis can move within the scrotum. Abnormal function of the scrotal ligament can allow for testicular torsion to occur.

References

External links
Gray, Henry. Anatomy of the Human Body. Philadelphia: Lea & Febiger, 1918; Bartleby.com, 2000.

Ligaments
Scrotum